Kimberly Jones (born September 28, 1957) is a retired American professional tennis player. She is also known by her married name, Kimberly Shaefer.

Career
Jones was a two-time NCAA All-American at San Diego State in 1977 and 1978. She turned professional in 1979 and joined the WTA Tour. In 1983, she won the US Indoor Championships and was runner-up at the Virginia Slims Hall of Fame Classic. She reached a career high ranking of #25 on March 19, 1984. She posted career victories over Pam Shriver, Zina Garrison, and Sylvia Hanika. She retired in 1987. She was the head tennis coach at the University of Cincinnati from 2003-2008.

Jones played three seasons of World Team Tennis from 1983 through 1985. She served as vice president of the WTA in 1984-85 and served on the board for four years.

WTA career finals

Singles: 2 (1-1)

References

External links
 
 

1957 births
Living people
American female tennis players
Sportspeople from Columbus, Georgia
Tennis people from Georgia (U.S. state)
21st-century American women
San Diego State Aztecs women's tennis players